Icing is a drinking game and Internet meme popular in 2010, in which one person, conceals a bottle of Smirnoff Ice in a place that another individual will find it: upon doing so they are immediately required to kneel and drink it. If handing the bottle to the person, they must willingly touch the bottle, otherwise the individual attempting to ice must get on one knee and drink. Participants are encouraged to come up with elaborate ways to present the Smirnoff Ice to their targets by hiding bottles or cans in inconspicuous locations, or in situations where drinking it would be dangerous or embarrassing (e.g. before they attend a meeting).

Gameplay

A player hides a bottle for another person to come across. When the iced person sees the bottle, they must chug the entire Ice. Other players who see the icer hide the Ice are exempt from drinking the ice. If the first person to touch the ice (the 'iced') fails to drink the whole bottle, the iced person cannot ice someone else.

An Ice block occurs when the iced is already carrying a bottle/can of Ice on their person, or is in reach of one without taking a step. If this happens, the icer (challenger) must drop and chug both Ices, the original presented Ice and the new blocking Ice.

Popularity
Icing, which was described by The New York Times in June 2010 as "the nation's biggest viral drinking game", grew in popularity shortly after the appearance of the website BrosIcingBros.com in May 2010.

There has been some doubt over whether this is an organic phenomenon or a marketing stunt by Smirnoff, which the company has denied. Advertising executive Dick Martin said "Beyond the implicit slur on the beverage's taste, I doubt any alcoholic beverage company would want to be associated with a drinking game that stretches the boundaries of good taste and common sense like this one does". The viral spread of the game has seen a boost in sales for the company. Smirnoff insists that the game is "consumer-generated" and has reminded the public to drink responsibly, and Diageo, the product's maker, stated "that 'icing' does not comply with our marketing code, and was not created or promoted by Diageo, Smirnoff Ice, or anyone associated with Diageo."

In the UK the trend has been criticised by some due to the low alcohol content of Smirnoff Ice. The media outlet Lad Bible described the trend as "Neither exciting (nor) impressive to those accustomed to Britain's drinking culture" and other readers described the beverage as a "children's drink".

See also

 List of drinking games

References

Drinking games
Viral marketing
2010s fads and trends